Vanessa altissima, the Andean painted lady, is a butterfly of the family Nymphalidae found in Ecuador and Peru.

References

External links
Butterflies of the Amazon and Andes - Andean painted lady

Butterflies described in 1914
altissima